Orest “Orri” Banach is a retired German-American soccer  goalkeeper of Ukrainian descent who played three seasons in the North American Soccer League and earned four caps with the U.S. national team.

Youth
While born in Germany, Banach grew up in the United States.  He graduated from East Leyden High School of Franklin Park, Illinois in 1965.

Club
Banach played for the Ukrainian Lions of the National Soccer League of Chicago.  In 1966, he moved to Toronto Roma of the Eastern Canada Professional Soccer League. In 1967, he played in the American Soccer League with the Rochester Lancers. After he return to the Ukrainian Lions. He then played six seasons in the North American Soccer League, in 1968 for the Boston Beacons, in 1969 for the Baltimore Bays, in 1971 for the St. Louis Stars, and in 1972 for the Ukrainian Lions.

National team
He also earned four caps, all World Cup qualifiers, with the U.S. national team between 1969 and 1972.  His first cap was a 2-0 loss to Haiti on April 20, 1969.  His second cap was another loss to Haiti on May 11, 1969.  He did not play again for the national team until a 3-2 loss to Canada on August 20, 1972.  In that game, he came out in 46th minute for Mike Winters.  His last cap came nine days later, a 2-2 tie with Canada.  He again came out of the game for Winter, this time in the 34th minute.

References

External links
 NASL stats
Ukrainian Football Diaspora @ Sport.ua

1948 births
Living people
People from Neu-Ulm
Sportspeople from Swabia (Bavaria)
American soccer players
American expatriate soccer players
Baltimore Bays players
Boston Beacons players
Eastern Canada Professional Soccer League players
National Soccer League (Chicago) players
North American Soccer League (1968–1984) players
St. Louis Stars (soccer) players
Toronto Roma players
Ukrainian Lions players
United States men's international soccer players
American people of Ukrainian descent
German people of Ukrainian descent
Soccer players from Illinois
East Leyden High School alumni
Association football goalkeepers
Footballers from Bavaria
Expatriate soccer players in Canada
American expatriate sportspeople in Canada
Rochester Lancers (1967–1980) players
American Soccer League (1933–1983) players